The 2004 East Carolina Pirates football team was an American football team that represented East Carolina University as a member of Conference USA during the 2004 NCAA Division I-A football season. In their second season under head coach John Thompson, the team compiled a 2–9 record.

Schedule

References

East Carolina
East Carolina Pirates football seasons
East Carolina Pirates football